Moses Randall Ehambe (born May 22, 1986) is an American professional basketball player for ESSM Le Portel of the LNB Pro A French League. He played college basketball for Oral Roberts.

College career
He played college basketball at Oral Roberts University.

Professional career
In September 2011, he signed with the Iowa Energy for the 2011–2012 season.

In September 2012, he signed with FIATC Joventut of the Spanish ACB League for the 2012–13 season.

In November 2013, he was re-acquired by the Iowa Energy.

On April 29, 2014, he signed with Guaiqueríes de Margarita for the 2014 LPB season.

On August 1, 2014, he signed with Eisbären Bremerhaven of Germany for the 2014–15 season.

On December 18, 2015, he signed with Kyoto Hannaryz of the Japanese bj league.

On August 25, 2016, he signed with German club SC Rasta Vechta.

References

External links
Profile at Eurobasket.com
RealGM profile

1986 births
Living people
African-American basketball players
American expatriate basketball people in France
American expatriate basketball people in Germany
American expatriate basketball people in Japan
American expatriate basketball people in Qatar
American expatriate basketball people in Spain
American expatriate basketball people in Venezuela
American men's basketball players
Austin Toros players
Basketball players at the 2011 Pan American Games
Basketball players from Texas
Club Ourense Baloncesto players
Eisbären Bremerhaven players
ESSM Le Portel players
Guaiqueríes de Margarita players
Iowa Energy players
Joventut Badalona players
Kyoto Hannaryz players
Liga ACB players
Medalists at the 2011 Pan American Games
Oral Roberts Golden Eagles men's basketball players
Pan American Games bronze medalists for the United States
Pan American Games medalists in basketball
SC Rasta Vechta players
Small forwards
Sportspeople from Arlington, Texas
Tulsa 66ers players
21st-century African-American sportspeople
20th-century African-American people